Zahedan University of Medical Sciences is a public university in Zahedan, Iran. The University has six faculties including medicine, dentistry, rehabilitation, health care, nursing, paramedicine and a satellite schools in Khash.

The university was founded in 1986 and it offers 64 fields in 6 faculties and its 378 academic members provide educational services to more than 4,400 students.

References

External links
 "Official Website of the Zahedan University of Medical Sciences"

Zahedan, University of Medical Sciences
Zahedan, University of Medical Sciences
Education in Sistan and Baluchestan Province
Buildings and structures in Sistan and Baluchestan Province
1986 establishments in Iran